The Pacific Tourism Organisation (SPTO) formerly known as the South Pacific Tourism Organisation is an intergovernmental organisation for the tourism sector in the South Pacific. The SPTO markets, promotes, and develops tourism in the Pacific in overseas markets. The main office is located in Suva, Fiji.

Originally, the organisation was funded by the European Union as a form of development aid. However, EU funding expired in 2004 and was not renewed. From that point onwards, the SPTO was forced to find other sources of income, which resulted in China becoming a member of the SPTO board.

History
The organisation was established in 1983 as the Tourism Council of the South Pacific (TCSP). In 1985 the European Economic Community provided the council with US$2.6 million to establish a joint marketing strategy, promote tourism, and study its impacts. In 1999 following an organisational review it changed its name to the South Pacific Tourism Organisation. The organisation was formalised with a multilateral treaty, the Constitution of the Pacific Tourism Organisation. The treaty was concluded and signed in Apia on 18 October 1999 by the governments of American Samoa, Cook Islands, Fiji, French Polynesia, Kiribati, New Caledonia, Niue, Papua New Guinea, Samoa, Solomon Islands, Tonga, Tuvalu, and Vanuatu. All of the signatory governments have ratified the constitution, except American Samoa. 

China signed the treaty and joined the SPTO in November 2004. Other nations have also joined, and as of 2021 the SPTO has 21 member states.

In 2019, the organisation renamed itself the Pacific Tourism Organisation.

Organisation
SPTO's supreme governing body is the Council of Tourism Ministers that meets annually. The council's primary functions include monitoring and reviewing SPTO's policies, strategies, work programmes and budgets. It is also responsible for securing funding for SPTO's activities.

A board of directors that meets about three times annually is responsible for the general administration of SPTO's operational and financial policies. The Board has one representative from each of the member countries and six from the Tourism Industry Members (TIMs). The Board implements the policies approved by the Council of Ministers. A Chief Executive, appointed by the Board, carries out the day-to-day administrative functions of SPTO. He is supported by a staff of 12.

Funding
SPTO is funded by
annual contributions from member countries,
donor agency funding for specific projects and
private sector member fees.

Services
SPTO  offers a range of services to its members which cover the following areas:

Research
 Regional Statistics Analysis 
 NTO Bi Annual Benchmarking Survey 
 Quarterly Market Intelligence Summary
 Market Intelligence Reports
 Membership Weekly Newsletter

Marketing
 Internet marketing and web development
 Overseas Representation
 Travel Show/Road Show Facilitation 
 Regional Collateral Material including 
 Regional Tourism Magazine
 Product Listing
 Members Forum

Membership Services
 Member Discounts 
 Photo Library 
 Banner Advertising 
 Database Marketing 
 Regional Tourism Conference

Policy, Planning and HRD Division
 Training Facilitation and Implementation
 Industry and stakeholder workshops
 Bi-annual Regional Tourism Conference
 Regional Tourism Policy and Planning 
 Technical Assistance 
 Project Management/Implementation Services
 Consultancy Database
 South Pacific Tourism Investment Guide

References

External links
Official website.
 
 

Organisations based in Fiji
Tourism in Oceania
Intergovernmental organizations established by treaty
Tourism agencies
Organizations established in 1999
1999 establishments in Fiji